The following are known to be, or have been, members of the Athenaeum Club, London.

Founders
 John Wilson Croker (1780–1857) (founder)
 James Burton (property developer) (1761–1837) (founder)
 Decimus Burton (1800–1881) (founder, designer of Clubhouse)
 Sir Humphry Davy (1778–1829) (founder, first chairman)
 Michael Faraday (1791–1867) (founder, first Secretary)
 Sir Thomas Lawrence (1769–1830) (designer of Club seal)
 Sir Francis Chantrey (1781–1841)
 Henry John Temple, 3rd Viscount Palmerston (1784–1865)

Members

 Sir Lawrence Alma-Tadema (1836–1912)
 Richard Ansdell (1815–1885)
 Edward Armitage R.A. (1817–1896)
 Matthew Arnold (1822–1888)
 Thomas Arnold (1795–1842)
 Alexander Bain (1818–1903)
 Roger Bannister (1929–2018)
 Sir Charles Barry (1795–1860)
 Gilbert Bayes (1872–1953)
 Robert Anning Bell (1863–1933)
 Jocelyn Bell Burnell
 Philip Bliss (academic) (1787-1857)
 Edward Wilmot Blyden (1832-1912)
 Joseph Edgar Boehm Bart., R.A. (1834–1890)
 Louis Lucien Bonaparte (1813-1891)
 Sir Adrian Boult (1889–1983)
 John Brett (1831–1902)
 John Bright (1811–1889)
 Sir Thomas Brock, K.C.B., R.A. (1847–1922)
 Robert Browning (1812–1889)
 William Buckland (1784–1856)
 Sir Edward Bulwer-Lytton (1803–1873)
 John Burdon-Sanderson (1825–1925)
 William Burges (1827–1881)
 Sir Edward Burne-Jones (1833–1896)
 Philip Burne-Jones (1861–1926)

 Frederick Burton (1816–1900)

 Sir Richard Francis Burton (1821–1890)
 George Busk (1807–1886)
 William Butterfield (1814–1900)
 Arthur Buxton (1882–1958)
 George Campbell, 8th Duke of Argyll (1823–1900)
 George Canning (1770–1827)
 Thomas Carlyle (1795–1881)
 Robert Chambers (1802–1871)
 Sir Francis Chantrey R.A. (1781–1841)
 Arthur Hugh Clough (1819–1861)
 Alfred Clayton Cole (1854–1920)
 Edward Colebrooke, 1st Baron Colebrooke (1861-1939)
 John Collier (1850–1934)
 Charles Darwin (1809–1892)
 William Reid Dick (1879–1961)
 Charles Dickens (1812–1870)
 Thomas Frognall Dibdin (1776-1847)
 Benjamin Disraeli (1804–1881)
 Charles Lutwidge Dodgson (Lewis Carroll) (1832–1898)
 Arthur Conan Doyle (1859–1930)
 Richard Doyle (1824–1883)
 George du Maurier (1834–1896)
 Robinson Duckworth (1834-1911)
 Sir Alfred East (1849–1913)
 Griffith Edwards (1928–2012)
 Quentin Edwards (1925-2010)
 Edward Elgar (1857–1934)
 Thomas Faed (1826–1900)

 Sir Luke Fildes (1844–1927)
 John Henry Foley R.A. (1818–1874)
 Robert James Forbes (1900–1973)
 John Forster (1812–1876)
 Sir George Frampton R.A. (1860–1928)
 Edward Frankland (1825–1899)
 William Powell Frith (1819–1909)
 Sir Alfred Gilbert R.A. (1854–1934)
 Sir Francis Grant (1803–1878)
 Alec Guinness (1914–2000)
 H. Rider Haggard (1856-1925)
 George Hamilton-Gordon, 4th Earl of Aberdeen (1784–1860)
 James Duffield Harding (1797–1863)
 Philip Hardwick (1792–1870)
 Philip Charles Hardwick (1822–1892)
 Thomas Hardy (1840–1928)
 Augustus Hare (1834–1903)
 Thomas Archer Hirst (1830–1892)
 Joseph Dalton Hooker (1817–1911)
 Alfred William Hunt (1830–1896)
 William Holman Hunt (1827–1910)
 Thomas Henry Huxley (1825–1895)
 John Rogers Herbert (1810–1890)
 Hubert von Herkomer (1849–1914)
 Washington Irving (1783–1859)
 Henry James (1843–1916)
 PD James, author (1920-2014)
 Robert Banks Jenkinson, second Earl of Liverpool (1770–1828)
 William Goscombe John (1860–1952)
 Owen Jones (1809–1874)
 Thomas Jones (1870–1955)
 Rudyard Kipling (1865–1936)
 William Lamb, 2nd Viscount Melbourne (1779–1848)
 Sir Edwin Henry Landseer (1802–1873)
 Andrew Lang (1844–1912)
 Benjamin Williams Leader (1831–1923)
 Frederic Leighton, 1st Baron Leighton (1830–1896)
 John Frederick Lewis (1805–1876)
 John Lubbock, 1st Baron Avebury (1834–1913)
 Sir Charles Lyell (1797–1875)
 Thomas Babington Macaulay (1800–1859)
 Daniel Maclise (1806–1870)
 Frederic Madden (1801-1873)
 Henry Edward Cardinal Manning (1807–1892)
 Gideon Mantell (1790–1852)
 Frederick Maurice (1805–1872)
 James Clerk Maxwell (1831–1879)
 Henry Melvill (1798–1871)
 Yehudi Menuhin (1916–1999)
 Diane Middlebrook (1939–2007)
 John Stuart Mill (1806–1873)
 Sir John Everett Millais (1829–1896)
 Henry Hart Milman (1791–1868)
 Leonard G. Montefiore (1889–1961)
 Patrick Moore (1923–2012)
 William Mulready R.A. (1786–1863)
 John Nash (1752–1835)
 Richard Owen (1804–1892)
 Robert Peel (1788–1850)
 Henry Alfred Pegram (1862–1937)
 Cooper Perry (1856–1938)
 St John Philby (1885–1960)
 Thomas Jodrell Phillips Jodrell (1807–1897)
 Thomas Phillipps (1792-1872)
 Edward Poynter R.A. (1821–1902)
 Valentine Cameron Prinsep (1838–1904)
 Richard Redgrave (1804–1888)
 Ralph Richardson (1902–1983)
 George Richmond (1809–1896)
 Sir William Blake Richmond (1842–1921)
 David Roberts (1796–1864)
 Samuel Rogers (1763–1855)
 John Ruskin (1819–1900)
 Lord John Russell (1792–1878)
 Owen Rutter (1889–1944)
 John Charles Ryle (1816–1900)
 Archibald Sayce (1845-1933)
 Jimmy Savile (1926–2011)
 John Liston Byam Shaw (1872–1919)
 Richard Norman Shaw (1831–1912)
 Sir Martin Archer Shee P.R.A. (1769–1850)
 John H. Smythe (1844–1908)
 Edward George Geoffrey Smith Stanley, 14th Earl of Derby (1799–1869)
 Solomon J. Solomon (1860–1927)
 William Somerville (1771–1860)
 Herbert Spencer (1820–1903)
 Charles Villiers Stanford (1852–1924)
 Clarkson Stanfield (1793–1867)
 Leslie Stephen (1832–1904)
 Robert Louis Stevenson (1850–1894)
 George Edmund Street (1824–1881)
 Arthur Sullivan (1842–1900)
 John Addington Symonds (1807–1871)
 Archibald Campbell Tait, Archbishop of Canterbury (1811–1882)
 Frederick Temple, Archbishop of Canterbury (1821–1903)
 Henry John Temple, Viscount Palmerston (1784–1865)
 Alfred, Lord Tennyson (1809–1892)
 William Makepeace Thackeray (1811–1863)
 William Turner Thiselton-Dyer
 Simon Thompson (b. 1959) 
 William Hamo Thornycroft R. A. (1850–1925)
 Rick Trainor (b. 1948)
 Anthony Trollope (1815–1882)
 Joseph Mallord William Turner R.A. (1775–1851)
 John Tyndall (1820–1893)
 Henry Vaughan (1809-1899)
 Gore Vidal (1925–2012)
 William Walton (1902–1983)
 John William Waterhouse (1849–1917)
 George Frederic Watts (1817–1904)
 Arthur Wellesley, 1st Duke of Wellington (1769–1852)
 Sir Richard Westmacott, Junior RA (1775–1856)
 William Whewell (1794–1866)
 Samuel Wilberforce, Bishop of Oxford (1805–1873)
 William Wilberforce (1759–1833)
 Thomas Woolner R.A. (1825–1892)

References

Sources
 
 

Athenaeum Club